The Boys' U17 South American Volleyball Championship is a sport competition for national volleyball teams with players under 17 years, currently held biannually and organized by the Confederación Sudamericana de Voleibol (CSV), the South American volleyball federation.

Results summary

Medals summary

See also

 Girls' U16 South American Volleyball Championship
 Men's Junior South American Volleyball Championship
 Men's U23 South American Volleyball Championship
 Boys' Youth South American Volleyball Championship

References

 CSV

U17
U17
V
International volleyball competitions
International men's volleyball competitions
Youth volleyball
Biennial sporting events